Civil Disobedients is the debut album by UK Ska-core band Capdown, released on May 22, 2000 through Household Name Records.

It was included in NME magazine's Top 100 Greatest Albums of the Decade list.

Track listing
"Unite to Progress"
"Kained but Able"
"Ska Wars"
"Jnr NBC"
"Dub No 1" (featuring The Dutch Master)
"Positivity"
"Cousin Cleotis"
"The Neverlution"
"Civil Disobedients"
"Headstrong"
"Deal Real"
"Bitches and Nike Shoes"

References

2000 albums
Household Name Records albums
Capdown albums